Gunnar Malmqvist is a former speedway rider from Sweden.

Speedway career 
Malmqvist was a leading speedway rider in the late 1960s. He reached the final of the Speedway World Championship in the 1968 Individual Speedway World Championship.

He rode in the top tier of British Speedway during the 1967 British League season, riding for Exeter Falcons.

World final appearances

Individual World Championship
 1968 –  Gothenburg, Ullevi – 10th – 7pts

References 

Living people
Year of birth missing (living people)
Swedish speedway riders
Exeter Falcons riders